Recon is a location-based online dating application and service specifically for gay men interested in fetish and kink. It launched as a website in 1999, and as an iOS app in 2010. It has 189,000 active users as of 2018.  

Like many other gay dating apps, such as Grindr and Scruff, Recon allows users to create a profile, communicate with other members through private messages, and filters members by location and interests. Unlike those apps, Recon started as a website, with some features, such as the ability to view a user’s public x-rated photos, are solely available on the website due to Apple's policy on adult content.

One notable feature is the ability to filter members by their declared fetishes and kinks. The broad categories include bondage, fisting, leather, rubber, bears, bikers, chastity, suits, feet, gunge, watersports, and sports gear.    

Recon is owned and operated by T101, the company who also produce Fetish Week London.

Events and publications 

Recon produces a number of fetish events for members and non-members, in cities including London and Paris. 

Recon has produced two issues of a magazine, with high-quality photography and articles from the fetish community, which is distributed for free at gay venues.

Controversies

Removal from YouTube 
In 2016, Recon’s YouTube channel was removed due to allegedly breaching adult content policies. A day after BuzzFeed News approached YouTube with questions about the removal, the channel was reinstated.

Effect on leather bars, sex clubs and saunas 
Some have claimed that gay dating apps have a negative impact on local businesses such as gay bars, and that Recon’s widespread usage by fetishmen has reduced business in leather bars, sex clubs and saunas. However, many businesses actively promote their businesses on Recon to appeal to local customers.

Location data leaks 
In 2019, researchers at Pen Test Partners demonstrated to BBC News how it was possible to locate the exact location of a Recon user without their consent, along with users of other apps, through a process of trilateration. However Recon was praised for taking immediate steps to rectify the fault much faster than some other apps.

References 

Gay culture
Fetish subculture
Location-based software